Holding the Fort was an ITV situation comedy starring Peter Davison, Patricia Hodge and Matthew Kelly.

Plot
The situation was a role-reversal comedy, in which the premise was that Russell Milburn (Davison) becomes a "house-husband" to raise his baby daughter while his wife, Penny (Hodge) a captain in the Women's Royal Army Corps, goes out to work.  Russell's friend Fitzroy, or "Fitz" (Kelly), adds to the comic tension by encouraging Russell's enthusiasm for football, pacifism and beer.

Cast
 Peter Davison as Russell Milburn
 Patricia Hodge as Penny Milburn
 Matthew Kelly as Fitz
 Christopher Godwin as Hector Quilley
 Victoria Kendall as Emma Milburn
 Christopher Benjamin as Col. Aubrey Sanderson
 Maev Alexander as Jennifer Quilley
 Keith Barron as Trevor Chesterton
 Tony Millan as Daniel

Production
It was an early product of the writing team of Laurence Marks and Maurice Gran.  Three series were recorded, a total of twenty episodes, first aired between 1980 and 1982, concurrent with Davison also starring in Doctor Who. It was made for the ITV network by LWT.

External links

1980s British sitcoms
1980 British television series debuts
1982 British television series endings
ITV sitcoms
Television series by ITV Studios
London Weekend Television shows
English-language television shows
Television shows set in London